The 1993 All Japan Grand Touring Car Championship was the inaugural season of the Japan Automobile Federation All-Japan Grand Touring Car Championship and the successor series to the All Japan Sports Prototype Championship as international prototypes were in a state of flux in the early 1990s, and sportscar racing globally had switched from prototypes to grand tourers. It was marked as well as the eleventh season of a JAF-sanctioned sports car racing championship dating back to the All Japan Sports Prototype Championship. 

Most events were staged as joint-races with the upstart Japan Super Sports Sedan Championship, and the IMSA GT Championship, with only a small handful of cars entered in the "GTS" category that would later evolve into the current GT500 class - and in fact, only one such car took part in that year's Suzuka 1000km against several Group C prototypes and sports cars from the N1 Endurance Series. Because the format and structure of the races were so different from what would come in future seasons, the 1993 season is not recognized by the GT Association (GTA), who were incorporated in 1994 to promote the All-Japan GT Championship (later to become Super GT).

The championship was contested over four rounds, and Masahiko Kageyama was declared the champion, driving a Nissan Skyline GT-R. He would also win the final All-Japan Touring Car Championship to be run to Group A regulations in the same year.

Schedule

Race results

References

Super GT seasons
JGTC